Schimpf is a German surname, which originally meant a humorous or playful person, from the Middle High German schimpf, meaning "play" or "amusement". The name may refer to:

Axel Schimpf (born 1952), German admiral
Richard Schimpf (1897–1972), German general
Rolf Schimpf (born 1924), German actor

See also
Schimpff's Confectionery, Jefferson, Indiana.
Ryan Schimpf, Major League Baseball player.

See also
Schrimpf

References

German-language surnames